is a 1941 Japanese film directed by Yasujirō Ozu.

Plot
The upper-class Toda family celebrates the 69th birthday of their father with a commemorative photoshoot at their outdoor garden. Unfortunately, shortly after the photo session, the father, Shintaro Toda (Hideo Fujino), suffers a fatal heart attack. After his death his eldest son, Shinichiro (Tatsuo Saitō) announces that as their father had acted as a guarantor for a company which has gone bankrupt, they must help pay off that company's debts. The family sells off all their late father's properties and antiques, leaving only an old house by the sea. Meanwhile, the mother (Ayako Katsuragi) and the youngest daughter Setsuko (Mieko Takamine) go and stay with Shinichiro and his wife. The unmarried second brother Shojiro (Shin Saburi) takes the opportunity to move away from Japan to Tianjin, China (which had been occupied by Japan during the Second Sino-Japanese war).

The mother and Setsuko soon clash with Shinichiro's wife, Kazuko, and go to stay with Chizuko (Mitsuko Yoshikawa), the married eldest sister. However, Setsuko's plans to go out to work are met with vehement objections from Chizuko, who finds the idea disgraceful since they are an upper-class family. Chizuko also clashes with the mother over her grandson, who has been playing truant from school. Eventually, Mrs Toda and Setsuko decide to move out to the unsold dilapidated apartment by the sea, instead of harassing Setsuko's second sister, Ayako (Yoshiko Tsubouchi), for a place to stay. Ayako and her husband are more than happy to let them stay elsewhere.

The first anniversary of the father's death arrives and the family comes together for a ceremonial gathering. Shojiro arrives in time for the family dinner, and is shocked to learn that his mother and Setsuko are staying alone by the sea. He reprimands his brother and his sisters in turn, rebuking them for not doing their part as children, and urges them to leave for home at once, which they do. After dinner, Shojiro asks his mother and sister to stay with him in Tianjin, and they agree to. Setsuko tries to arrange a marriage between Shojiro and her friend Tokiko (Michiko Kuwano), who has come for a visit, but Shojiro runs off to the beach before she can get them to meet.

Cast
 Mieko Takamine - Setsuko Toda
 Shin Saburi - Shojiro Toda
 Hideo Fujino - Shintaro Toda
 Ayako Katsuragi - Mrs. Toda
 Mitsuko Yoshikawa - Chizuru
 Chishū Ryū - Friend
 Masao Hayama - Ryokichi
 Tatsuo Saitō - Shinichiro
 Kuniko Miyake - Kazuko

DVD release
In 2010, the BFI released a Region 2 DVD of the film as a bonus feature on its Dual Format Edition (Blu-ray + DVD) of Tokyo Story.

References

External links
 

1941 films
Films directed by Yasujirō Ozu
1940s Japanese-language films
Shochiku films
Best Film Kinema Junpo Award winners
Japanese black-and-white films
Films with screenplays by Tadao Ikeda
Films with screenplays by Yasujirō Ozu
Japanese drama films
1941 drama films